Bolting, when referring to equids, generally refers to two equine behaviors, both undesirable:
 Running away without control.
 Eating food at a dangerously fast rate.
However, there are other meanings as well. For example, in Australia a bolter is a racehorse that wins at long betting odds.

Runaways

Most often, bolting refers to a "runaway" - horses that gallop off with a handler at high speed, whether being ridden under saddle or driving in harness. There are many causes, most linked to fright that triggers the fight-or-flight response of the horse. In these circumstances, the horse is often running in a panic and may not notice where it is going, creating danger for both horse and rider.

Less often, bolting is a deliberate disobedience by a horse that wishes to rid itself of a handler or avoid an unpleasant situation. In both cases, bolting horses are usually stopped by being turned in some type of circle by pulling on one rein to turn the head to the side, as directly pulling on both reins has little impact.

Bolting is also sometimes seen in horse racing when the horse chooses to ignore its jockey and run as it wishes, often in a manner that makes it difficult for the rider to maneuver the horse or rate its speed.  Bolting race horses often head toward the outer rail of the track and even lose racing speed in an attempt to evade the rider's commands.

Horses may also bolt if greatly frightened when loose in a pen or pasture. In a confined area, this may result in an animal running into or jumping a fence.

The phrase "take the bit in his/her teeth" is a colloquial reference to bolting. However, in reality, a bolting horse usually does not take the bit in its teeth, as the bit rests on the gums in an interdental space where there are no teeth. What a horse actually does is to raise its head and tighten its jaw in a manner that allows it to ignore bit pressure.  While a horse can move the bit to its molars and chew on it, this is not generally how a horse evades the bit when bolting.

Feeding habits
The term "bolting" may also refer to a horse that eats its feed too quickly, particularly grain or other concentrated feed.  This is undesirable as it can, in some cases, lead to choking or colic.  Proper equine nutrition may reduce bolting of feed.   Methods to prevent bolting feed involve adding objects such as hay cubes, chopped straw ("chaff") or medium-sized rocks to a feed container to slow the horse's eating.

See also
Riding aids
Stable vices

External links
Runaway horses often left path of destruction - Pantagraph (Bloomington, Illinois newspaper)

Horse health
Horse behavior